2023 Uttar Pradesh municipal elections are expected to be held in 2023 to elect members of all 734 municipalities in the state. There are 17 Nagar Nigams, 200 Nagar Palika Parishad and 546 Nagar Panchayats in the state of Uttar Pradesh.

Statistics

Municipal Corporations 
see this article: List of urban local bodies in Uttar Pradesh

Municipal Corporations in which the election is scheduled.

Lucknow Municipal Corporation

Kanpur Municipal Corporation

Varanasi Municipal Corporation

Allahabad Municipal Corporation

Political Parties
Political parties that will contest are-

 Nationalist Congress Party 
 Bahujan Samaj Party
 Communist Party of India
 Bharatiya Janata Party
 Indian National Congress
 Janata Dal (United)
 Communist Party of India (Marxist) 
 Communist Party of India (ML) 
 Samata Party
 Samajwadi Party
 Rashtriya Lok Dal
 Rashtriya Janata Dal
 Lok Janshakti Party
 Janata Dal (Secular)
 All India Forward Bloc
 All India Majlis-e-Ittehadul Muslimeen
 Aam Admi Party
 Indian Union Muslim League

External links
 Urban Development Department
 Local Bodies Directorate
 State Election Commission

References
 

Elections in Uttar Pradesh
UP
Uttar Pradesh